David Brown (16 May 1928 – 14 August 2004) was an American competition rower and Olympic champion, and later physician. He won a gold medal in coxed eights at the 1948 Summer Olympics, as a member of the American team.

References

1928 births
2004 deaths
Rowers at the 1948 Summer Olympics
Olympic gold medalists for the United States in rowing
American male rowers
Medalists at the 1948 Summer Olympics